Target... Maganto is a 1988 Filipino action film based on the life of Lt. Col. Romeo Maganto of the Western Police District in Manila. Directed by Leonardo L. Garcia, the film stars Ronnie Ricketts as the eponymous police commander, alongside Charlie Davao, Monica Herrera, Paquito Diaz, Romy Diaz, Nick Romano, Renato del Prado, Bing Davao and Aurora Salve. It is the first film to be made about Maganto's life; later films include Leon ng Maynila (1991) and The Legend: Tomagan (2003). Produced by GVM Productions, the film was released on April 8, 1988.

Critic Lav Diaz gave Maganto a negative review, criticizing its highly fictionalized depiction of the Sparrow Unit, a communist militant group of the New People's Army.

Plot
Lt. Col. Romeo Maganto is a dedicated police commander of the Western Police District. His repeated raids against a syndicate's operations eventually lead to a confrontation between him and the Sparrow Unit led by Archie.

Cast
Ronnie Ricketts as Lt. Col. Romeo S. Maganto
Charlie Davao
Monica Herrera as Elaine, Romeo's wife
Paquito Diaz as Archie
Romy Diaz
Nick Romano
Renato del Prado
Bing Davao
Aurora Salve

Release
Target... Maganto was graded "C" by the Movie and Television Review and Classification Board (MTRCB), indicating a "Fair" quality. The film was released in theaters on April 8, 1988.

Critical response
Lav Diaz, writing for the Manila Standard, gave Maganto a negative review. He criticized the film's highly fictionalized portrayal of the Sparrow Unit, focusing especially on the fictional character of Archie, as he thought that there were enough material written about them in newspapers for the filmmakers to have a more accurate depiction of the group. Diaz was also critical of the actors' performances, singling out in particular Ronnie Ricketts and Monica Herrera's portrayal of a married couple with three children being contradicted by their performances, which are that of lovers just starting to know each other.

See also
Other depictions of the Sparrow Unit in film:
Target: Sparrow Unit (1987), also starring Ronnie Ricketts
Ambush (1988), also starring Ronnie Ricketts
Patrolman (1988)
Alex Boncayao Brigade (1989), also starring Ronnie Ricketts

References

External links

1988 films
1988 action films
Action films based on actual events
Cultural depictions of Filipino men
Filipino-language films
Films about police officers
Films set in Manila
Philippine action films